Karanganom is an administrative district in Indonesia. It is located in the Klaten Regency in Central Java.

Rice and sugar cane are among the crops cultivated by farmers in Karanganom. An academic study published in 2020 examined the motivations of organic rice farmers in the area.

References

External links
 Maplandia

Klaten Regency
Districts of Central Java